Naryan-Mar (Nenets: Няръянa марˮ, Njarjana marꜧ, literally "red town") is a sea and river port town and the administrative center of the Nenets Autonomous Okrug, Russia. Naryan-Mar lies north of the Arctic Circle. Population:    17,000 (1973). About half of the population of Nenetsia lives in the city.

History
Industrial development in the area around Naryan-Mar began in 1930, in the course of the first five-year plan of the Soviet Union. The growth of the region was the direct result of the development of the Pechora coalfield and the construction of related industrial infrastructure.

Naryan-Mar was for many years a center of the lumber industry, and possesses several large, and currently defunct, lumber mills. At present, the biggest employer in the town is the petroleum company LUKoil.

The town's importance derives from being the only developed commercial port in an area of several thousand square miles. As a result, Naryan-Mar has a reasonably well developed tourist and hospitality services, with several saunas and hotels. The town also hosts a local museum, a large World War II memorial, an Orthodox church, and a historic district which predates the foundation of the modern city. Sports fishing is also possible in the area.

Administrative and municipal status
Naryan-Mar is the administrative center of the autonomous okrug. Within the framework of administrative divisions, it is incorporated as the town of okrug significance of Naryan-Mar—an administrative unit with the status equal to that of the districts. As a municipal division, the town of okrug significance of Naryan-Mar is incorporated as Naryan-Mar Urban Okrug.

Transportation

The town is served by the Naryan-Mar Airport, which is connected to the town by the -long A-381.

Climate
Naryan-Mar has a subarctic climate (Köppen climate classification Dfc) with short, mild summers that may exceed  and very cold winters. Precipitation is somewhat greater in summer than in winter.

References

Notes

Sources

 
Barents Sea
Port cities and towns in Russia
Cities and towns built in the Soviet Union
Populated places established in 1935
Populated places of Arctic Russia
Cities and towns in Nenets Autonomous Okrug
1935 establishments in Russia